Campethera is a genus of bird in the family Picidae, or woodpeckers, that are native to sub-Saharan Africa. Most species are native to woodland and savanna rather than deep forest, and multiple species exhibit either arboreal or terrestrial foraging strategies. Its nearest relative is the monotypic genus Geocolaptes of southern Africa, which employs terrestrial foraging and breeding strategies. They are however not close relatives of similar-looking woodpeckers in the "Dendropicos clade".

Taxonomy
The genus Campethera was introduced by the English zoologist George Robert Gray in 1841 with the little green woodpecker (Campethera maculosa) as the type species. The generic name combines the Ancient Greek kampē meaning "caterpillar" and  -thēras meaning "hunter".

Species diversity in the "Campethera clade" is believed to be understated, and up to 18 species may be involved. The following 11 species are currently recognized:

Description
They are small to medium-sized woodpeckers. The sexes are fairly similar, but males of most species have the crown and nape bright red, while in females this is restricted to the nape. Colour of the malar plumage is also useful in sexing.

Their plumage pattern is fairly uniform, and some species are only distinguishable by careful observation. The mantle, back and wings are olive-greenish, and usually spotted or barred in buffy to golden yellow. The shafts of the remiges and rectrices are yellow to golden yellow. The underpart plumage is spotted black to a lesser or greater degree.

Some species include drumming on dead wood as a means of non-vocal signaling. Most species are poor drummers however, and some species may not drum at all.

Foraging
Their rectrices are only partially stiffened (for arboreal support), and they readily take to terrestrial foraging. Ants and termites form important components of their diet. These are lapped up with a flexible and sticky tongue.

Gallery

References

 
Bird genera
 
Taxa named by George Robert Gray
Taxonomy articles created by Polbot